Birgit Keppler-Stein (born 26 August 1963) is a German freestyle skier. She was born in Pfullingen. She competed at the 1992 Winter Olympics in Albertville, where she placed fifth in women's moguls. She also competed at the 1994 Winter Olympics in Lillehammer.

References

External links 
 

1963 births
Living people
Sportspeople from Tübingen (region)
German female freestyle skiers
Olympic freestyle skiers of Germany
Freestyle skiers at the 1992 Winter Olympics
Freestyle skiers at the 1994 Winter Olympics
20th-century German women
21st-century German women
People from Reutlingen (district)